This region was owned by the Chera Dynasty. It includes the Districts of Salem, Namakkal, Dharmapuri and Krishnagiri. In the ancient sangam age this region was ruled by Mazhavar King Kolli Mazhavan. It was mentioned in a Tamil poem.

Demographics and Geography
The table below lists geographic and demographic parameters for districts that constitute Mazhanadu.

References

Regions of Tamil Nadu